The animated cat and mouse duo Tom and Jerry have appeared in various video games.

Release chart

List

Computer game

Tom & Jerry (also known as Tom & Jerry: Hunting High and Low) was released for Amiga, Atari ST, and Commodore 64 computers in 1989 by Magic Bytes. Another game with identical gameplay, Tom & Jerry 2, was also released that year for the same platforms and the MSX, Amstrad CPC, and ZX Spectrum home computers.

NES/MS-DOS game
A Tom and Jerry video game (also known as Tom and Jerry: The Ultimate Game of Cat and Mouse! or Tom and Jerry (and Tuffy)) was released by Hi Tech Expressions for the Nintendo Entertainment System on December 3, 1991 and for MS-DOS in 1993. Tom has mouse-napped Jerry's nephew Tuffy and locked him in a trunk in the attic. Usable weapons include bubble gum, meat cleaver, cups of water, moth balls, hammer, invisible ink and drill.
Tom and Jerry: Yankee Doodle's CAT-astrophe was released for the PC in 1990, also by Hi Tech Expressions.

Game Boy games
Tom and Jerry was released in October 1992 by Hi Tech Expressions in the US and by Altron in Japan.
Tom and Jerry: Frantic Antics! is a video game based on the 1992 film Tom and Jerry: The Movie. The game was released on October 2, 1992 for the Game Boy and in December 1993 for the Sega Genesis.

Sega game

Based on the 1992 film of the same name, and released for Master System and Game Gear.

Super NES game
A Tom and Jerry video game was released for the Super NES by Hi Tech Expressions in April 1993 in the US and by Altron on June 25, 1993 in Japan. The player controls Jerry, the mouse, as he traverses through four different themed worlds – a movie theater, a junkyard, a toy store, and a house. Tuffy is playable through second player.

Jerry or Tuffy use marbles as weapons. At the end of each world, Jerry goes into a battle with Tom, the cat.

Entertainment Weekly gave the game a B and wrote that "The competent yet often uninspired Hanna-Barbera cartoon series is now a competent yet often uninspired video game. In Tom & Jerry (Hi Tech Expressions, for Super NES), very small players may get a kick out of guiding mouse Jerry through nemesis Tom's none-too-wily traps."

Game Boy Color
Tom and Jerry was released on September 27, 1999 by Majesco Sales Inc. It is a colorised version of the 1992 Game Boy game that also adds a bonus card-match game between each level. 
Tom and Jerry: Mouse Attacks was released on December 8, 2000 by Ubisoft.
Tom and Jerry: Mouse Hunt was released on March 14, 2001 by Conspiracy Entertainment.

Fighting games
Several fighting games have been released.

Tom and Jerry: Yankee Doodle's CAT-astrophe (1990) for Microsoft Windows
Tom and Jerry in Fists of Furry (2000) for Nintendo 64 and Microsoft Windows
Tom and Jerry in House Trap (2000) for the PlayStation and Game Boy Color
Tom and Jerry in War of the Whiskers (2003) for PlayStation 2, Xbox, and Nintendo GameCube
Tom and Jerry Cheese Chase (2004) for mobile phone
Tom and Jerry Food Fight (2005) for mobile phone
Tom and Jerry Pinball Pursuit (2007) for mobile phone
Tom and Jerry: Mouse Maze (2008) for mobile phone

References

External links

 
Windows games
Android (operating system) games
Lists of video games by franchise